Jorge Horacio Borelli (born 2 November 1964, in Buenos Aires) is an Argentine former footballer and current assistant manager of Tigre.

Career
He played in the defence at both club and international levels, and with the Argentina national football team, he featured in the team's victorious 1993 Copa América campaign in Ecuador, and at the 1994 FIFA World Cup in the United States.

Borelli began his career at Platense  in 1980, he soon came to the attention of River Plate and signed for the Argentine giants in 1985. In his time at River he helped the club to win the 1985-1986 Primera, their first Copa Libertadores, the Copa Intercontinental and the Copa Interamericana. In 1989, he left River to play for  UANL Tigres but in 1991 he returned to Argentina to play for Racing Club de Avellaneda. In 1994, he moved to Club Atlético San Lorenzo de Almagro where he won the Clausura 1995 tournament. Borelli retired as a player in 1996.

Borelli has a Mexican son, called Eder, who currently plays for UANL Tigres.

Coaching career
After retiring, Borelli became the assistant manager of San Lorenzo. In the 2002/03 season, Borelli was the assistant manager of Néstor Gorosito at Nueva Chicago. In December 2004, he followed Gorosito when he was appointed as manager of Club Atlético Lanús.

In December 2015, Néstor Gorosito was appointed as manager of Spanish club UD Almería and took Borelli with him as his assistant.

On 12 February 2019, Borelli was appointed as the assistant manager of Néstor Gorosito at Tigre.

Honours
River Plate
Primera Division Argentina: 1985–86
Copa Libertadores: 1986
Intercontinental Cup: 1986
Copa Interamericana: 1987

San Lorenzo
Primera Division Argentina: Clausura 1995

Argentina
FIFA Confederations Cup: 1992
Copa América: 1993
Artemio Franchi Trophy: 1993

References

External links
Jorge Borelli at Footballdatabase

1964 births
Living people
Footballers from Buenos Aires
Argentine footballers
Argentina under-20 international footballers
Argentina youth international footballers
Argentina international footballers
1992 King Fahd Cup players
1993 Copa América players
1994 FIFA World Cup players
Copa América-winning players
Copa Libertadores-winning players
FIFA Confederations Cup-winning players
Club Atlético Platense footballers
Club Atlético River Plate footballers
Tigres UANL footballers
Racing Club de Avellaneda footballers
San Lorenzo de Almagro footballers
Argentine Primera División players
Liga MX players
Argentine expatriate footballers
Argentine expatriate sportspeople in Mexico
Expatriate footballers in Mexico
Association football defenders